is Japanese singer-songwriter Ua's first re-cut single and third overall, released on February 21, 1996. "Taiyō Te ni Tsuki wa Kokoro no Ryōte ni" is Ua's first single to chart, peaking at #99 with 3,040 units sold in its first week.

Track listing

Charts and sales

References

External links
 SPEEDSTAR RECORDS | UA 「太陽手に月は心の両手に」

1996 singles
Ua (singer) songs
1996 songs